This is a list of people from Barnsley, a town in South Yorkshire, England. This list is arranged alphabetically by surname:

A
 John Arden (1930–2012), playwright
 Maggie Atkinson, the Children's Commissioner for England

B
 Alan Barton (1953–1995), singer
 Josh Bates (1996–), professional speedway rider
 Mark Beevers (1989–), footballer, Peterborough United, formerly Sheffield Wednesday, Millwall, Bolton Wanderers
 Mike Betts (1956–), retired professional footballer
 Dickie Bird (1933–), international cricket umpire
 Dai Bradley, actor, Billy Casper in Ken Loach's film Kes
 Joseph Bramah (1748–1814), inventor of flushing water closet, Bramah lock and the beer pump
 Pete Brown (1968–), beer writer and columnist
 Stan Burton (1912–1977), former Wolverhampton Wanderers player, played in 1939 FA Cup Final

C
 John Casken (1949-), composer
 Ed Clancy (1985–), professional cyclist
 Wilf Copping (1909–1980), footballer, played for England 20 times
 Mark Crossley (1969–), former Nottingham Forest, Fulham and Sheffield Wednesday and Chesterfield goalkeeper. 
 Nick Crowe (1968–), artist

D
 Shaun Dooley, actor
 Alan Doonican II, comedy folk-musician - accordionist/keyboardist in The Bar-Steward Sons of Val Doonican 
 Scott Doonican, comedy folk-musician - lead vocalist/guitarist with The Bar-Steward Sons of Val Doonican
 Björn Doonicansson, comedy folk-musician - banjo/mandolin/fiddle player with The Bar-Steward Sons of Val Doonican
 Kenny Doughty, actor
 John Duttine (1949–), actor

E
 Leonard Knight Elmhirst (1893–1974), philanthropist
 Air Marshal Sir Thomas Elmhirst (1895–1982), Commander-in-Chief Royal Indian Air Force, Lieutenant-Governor and Commander-in-Chief of Guernsey
 Bethany England, (1994-),  English footballer, 2019/2020 Player of the Year, plays for Chelsea in the FA WSL and England

F
 Joann Fletcher, Egyptologist
 Toby Foster, Radio Sheffield presenter, comedian and actor

G
 Brian Glover (1934–1997), actor
 Darren Gough (1970–), cricketer
 Brian Greenhoff (1953–2013), footballer, Manchester United and Leeds United
 Jimmy Greenhoff (1946–), footballer, Manchester United and Leeds United

H
 Alan Hill (footballer, born 1943) (1943-), footballer 
 Charlie Hardcastle (1894–1960), boxer
 Joanne Harris (1964–), novelist, Chocolat
 Paul Heckingbottom (1977–), born in Barnsley, an English former footballer, played for Barnsley 2006–2008, and was the team manager from 2016–2018.
Barry Hines (1939 - 2016), author of A Kestrel for a Knave, among other works.
 David Hirst (1967–), England international footballer, played for Barnsley before joining Sheffield Wednesday
 Stephanie Hirst (1976–), radio presenter, former host of hit40uk on commercial radio throughout the UK
 Geoff Horsfield (1973–), professional footballer turned coach
 Alan Hydes (1947-), International table tennis player and 4 times Commonwealth gold medal winner 
 Dorothy Hyman (1941–), sprinter

I
 Graham Ibbeson, sculptor, artist, responsible for statue outside NUM Head Offices, Barnsley, and Eric Morecambe statue in Morecambe

J
 Ashley Jackson, artist
 Admiral of the Fleet, Sir Henry Bradwardine Jackson (1855–1929), GCB, FRS, first Sea Lord, 1915–1916; pioneer of ship to ship wireless technology
 Milly Johnson (1964–), author
 Mark Jones (1933–1958), one of the eight Manchester United players killed in the Munich air disaster

K
 Katherine Kelly (1980–present), actress, played Becky Granger in ITV soap opera Coronation Street
 James Kitchenman (1825-1909), carpet manufacturer

L
 Ethel Lang (1900–2015), supercentenarian
 Davey Lawrence (1985–), ice hockey netminder playing for the Sheffield Steelers
 Joseph Locke (1805–1860), civil engineer
 Stephen Lodge (1952–), former Premier League referee; retired from top-flight officiating at the end of the 2000–01 season

M
Danny Malin, (1980–), Internet celebrity and food reviewer
 Baron Mason of Barnsley (1924–2015), former Northern Ireland Secretary
 John Mayock (1970–), former 1500m runner, member of Team GB, 3000m gold medallist at the 1998 European Athletics Indoor Championships
 Mick McCarthy (1959–), footballer, manager of  Ipswich Town F.C. and Republic of Ireland national football team (1996–2002, 2018–)
 Paul McCue (1958–), author and military historian
 David McLintock (1930–2003), philologist and German translator
 Ian McMillan (1956–), the Bard of Barnsley
 CJ de Mooi, former panellist on quiz show Eggheads
 Chris Morgan (1977–), ex-professional football player; formerly played for the town's football club; now a coach at Sheffield United
 Martyn Moxon (1960–), cricketer who played for Yorkshire and played in 10 test matches for England
 Jenni Murray (1950–), journalist and broadcaster, current presenter of Woman's Hour on BBC Radio 4

N
 Sam Nixon (1986–), came 3rd on Pop Idol 2003; singer and television co-host
 Victoria Nixon, model and writer

O
 Richard O'Dwyer, university student, creator of TV Shack; in the process of extradition to the US on charges of conspiracy to commit copyright infringement and criminal infringement of copyright
 Craig Oldham (born 1985), designer
Julie O'Neill, novelist. Born in Staincross in 1971.

P
 Jon Parkin (1981–), professional footballer, playing for York City F.C.; nicknamed 'The Beast'
 Michael Parkinson (1935–), talk show host, journalist and television presenter

R
 William Rayner (1929-2006), novelist
 Stan Richards (1930–2005), actor
 Danny Rose (1993–), football player for Northampton Town, previously played for Barnsley, Bury and Mansfield Town.
 Kate Rusby (1973–), folk singer
 Oliver Rowland (1992-), racecar driver

S
 Mary Sadler, Lady Sadler (1852–1931), heiress and hostess
 Arthur Scargill (1938–), leader of the National Union of Mineworkers, 1981-2000; founded the Socialist Labour Party in 1996, currently the party's leader
 Harry Leslie Smith (1923–2018), author of Harry's Last Stand (2014), and autobiographical works.
 Danielle Steers (1991–) English stage actress and singer-songwriter
 John Stones, (1994–), English footballer, currently plays for Manchester City and England national football team.

T
 James Hudson Taylor (1832–1905), Protestant Christian missionary to China; founder of the China Inland Mission (now OMF International)
 Tommy Taylor (1932–1958), professional footballer, one of the 'Busby Babes' (or Manchester United under the management of Matt Busby) who was killed in the Munich air disaster

W
 Obadiah Walker (1616–1699), academic and Master of University College, Oxford from 1676 to 1688
 Charlie Williams (1928–2006), ex-professional footballer and stand-up comedian
 David Williams (born 1948), cricketer
 Harry Worth (1917–1989), actor, comedian and ventriloquist
 Celia Wray (1872-1954), architect and suffragette

References

Barnsley
People from Barnsley